Nationality words link to articles with information on the nation's poetry or literature (for instance, Irish or France).

Events
 May 23 — C. P. Cavafy's poem "Ithaka" is read at the funeral of Jacqueline Kennedy Onassis by her longtime companion, Maurice Tempelsman.
 October 6 — First annual National Poetry Day in the United Kingdom, established by William Sieghart.
 October 31 (Halloween) — 15,000 copies of Edgar Allan Poe's "The Raven" are distributed free at public libraries. In Austin, Texas, someone from the local coroner's office and someone from a local tax department gives a "death and taxes" reading of the poem.
 Allen Ginsberg sells his papers to Stanford University for $1 million.
 Wyn Cooper's "All I Wanna Do" is put to music by Sheryl Crow who makes it the United States' No. 1 hit rock tune.
 Welsh poet Tony Curtis becomes Professor of Poetry at the University of Glamorgan.
 Poetry Canada Review folds, the publication was founded in 1978 by Clifton Whiten in order to publish and review poetry from across Canada.

Poets depicted in the movies
 Dorothy Parker's poems are featured in Mrs. Parker and the Vicious Circle
 In the film Four Weddings and a Funeral, directed by Mike Newell, W. H. Auden's "Stop all the clocks" is read as a eulogy. "[I]t so moved audiences that Random House published a slender paperback with "Funeral Blues" plus nine other Auden poems in a hot-selling edition of forty thousand copies."
 Pablo Neruda's 1952 stay in a villa owned by Italian historian Edwin Cerio on the island of Capri is depicted in a fictionalized version this year the popular film Il Postino ("The Postman"). Neruda is treated worshipfully in the film.

Works published in English
Listed by nation where the work was first published and again by the poet's native land, if different; substantially revised works listed separately:

Australia
 Robert Adamson Waving to Hart Crane
 Jennifer Harrison: Michelangelo's Prisoners, winner of the 1995 Anne Elder Award for first book of poetry; North Fitzroy: Black Pepper
 Les Murray:
 Collected Poems, Port Melbourne, William Heinemann Australia
 Translations from the Natural World
 David Rowthbaum, New and Selected Poems (1945-93)

Canada
 Christian Bök, Crystallography 
 Roo Borson, Night Walk,  (nominated for a Governor General's Award) American-Canadian
 Margaret Christakos, Other Words for Grace (Stratford, Ontario: Mercury Press)
 George Elliott Clarke, Lush Dreams, Blue Exile: Fugitive Poems 1978–1993. Lawrencetown Beach, Nova Scotia: Pottersfield,  Canada
 Don Domanski, Stations of the Left Hand (nominated for a Governor General's Award)
 Cherie Geauvreau, Even the Fawn Has Wings, a first collection
 Gary Geddes, Girl by the Water
 Ralph Gustafson, Tracks in the Snow
 Evelyn Lau, In the House of Slaves
 Tim Lilburn, Moosewood Sandhills, winner of the Canadian Authors Association Award for Poetry, Canada
 A. F. Moritz:
 Mahoning
 Phantoms in the Ark
 Susan Musgrave, Forcing the Narcissus
 P. K. Page, Hologram: A Book of Glosas, poems in 14th-century Spanish stanzaic form
 John Pass, Radical Innocence Canadian
 Al Purdy, Naked with Summer in Your Mouth
 Linda Rogers, Hard Candy, including "Wrinkled Coloratura", winner of the new Stephen Leacock Award
 Joe Rosenblatt, Beds and Consenting Dreamers
 Stephen Scobie, Gospel
 Francis Sparshott, The Hanging Gardens of Etobicoke
 George Woodcock, George Woodcock's Introduction to Canadian Poetry, Toronto: ECW Press

India, in English
 Imtiaz Dharker, Postcards from God ( Poetry in English ), Viking Penguin
 Eunice de Souza, Selected and New Poems ( Poetry in English ), St Xavier's College, Department of English Publication, Mumbai.
 E.V. Ramakrishnan, A Python in A Snake Park, New Delhi: Rupa and Co., 
 Sudeep Sen:
 Mount Vesuvius in Eight Frames, New York City: White Swan Books; Leeds: Peepal Tree, 
 South African Woodcut, New York City: White Swan Books; Leeds: Peepal Tree, 
 C. P. Surendran, Gemini II, New Delhi: Penguin (Viking)
 Robin Ngangom, Time's Crossroads, Hyderabad: Orient Longman Ltd, 
 Ruth Vanita, A Play of Light: Selected Poems ( Poetry in English ), New Delhi: Penguin India

Ireland
 Eavan Boland, In a Time of Violence, including "Anna Liffey", "The Black Lace Fan My Mother Gave Me", "The Latin Lesson" and "Midnight Flowers", Carcanet Press
 Vona Groarke, Shale, Oldcastle: The Gallery Press
 Michael Hartnett, Selected and New Poems, including "Bread", "I have exhausted the delighted range ...", "For My Grandmother, Bridget Halpin", "A Farewell to English", "Lament for Tadgh Cronin's Children" and "The Man who Wrote Yeats, the Man who Wrote Mozart", Oldcastle: The Gallery Press
 Medbh McGuckian:
 Venus and the Rain, revised edition (first edition 1984), Oldcastle: The Gallery Press
 Captain Lavender, including "Porcelain Bells", Oldcastle: The Gallery Press
 Paula Meehan, Pillow Talk, including "Laburnum", Oldcastle: The Gallery Press
 Eiléan Ní Chuilleanáin, The Brazen Serpent, including "The Real Thing" and "Saint Margaret of Cortona", Oldcastle: The Gallery Press
 Tom Paulin, Walking a Line, including "The Lonely Tower", Faber and Faber, Irish poet published in the United Kingdom

New Zealand
 Fleur Adcock (New Zealand poet who moved to England in 1963) translator, Hugh Primas and the Archpoet, Cambridge, England, and New York: Cambridge University Press
 Lauris Edmond, Selected Poems, 1975-1994, Wellington: Bridget Williams Books
 Michele Leggott, DIA, Auckland: Auckland University Press; winner of the New Zealand Book Award for Poetry
 Hone Tuwhare, Deep River Talk, 140 poems from 10 previous collections

United Kingdom
 Fleur Adcock (New Zealand poet who moved to England in 1963) translator, Hugh Primas and the Archpoet, Cambridge, England, and New York: Cambridge University Press
 Eavan Boland, In a Time of Violence
 Alan Brownjohn, In the Cruel Arcade
 Gerry Cambridge, The Dark Gift and Other Poems, St. Inan's Press (16 pages; "I used to produce this tiny pamphlet from my breast pocket at poetry readings, and announce I would read from my complete and unexpurgated works", Cambridge wrote on his website.)
 William Cookson, editor, Agenda – An Anthology 1959-1993, Carcanet Press, 
 Carol Ann Duffy:
 Editor, Anvil New Poets Volume 2 Penguin (anthology), sources also give 1995 and 1996 as publication year
 Selected Poems Penguin
 Helen Dunmore, Recovering a Body
 Paul Durcan Give Me Your Head
 James Fenton, Out of Danger, Penguin; Farrar Straus Giroux; winner of the Whitbread Prize for Poetry
 Elaine Feinstein, Selected Poems, Carcanet
 Roy Fisher, Birmingham River
 Philip Gross, I.D.
 Adrian Henri, Not Fade Away
 Selma Hill, Trembling Hearts in the Bodies of Dogs
 Kathleen Jamie, The Queen of Sheba
 Alan Jenkins, Harm
 Elizabeth Jennings, Familiar Spirits
 Thomas Kinsella, From Centre City
 Peter Levi, The Rags of Time
 Medbh McGuckian, Captain Lavender
 Derek Mahon, The Yaddo Letter
 Glyn Maxwell, Mick Imlah and Peter Reading, Penguin New Poets 3, 
 Andrew Motion, The Price of Everything
 Paul Muldoon:
 The Annals of Chile
 The Prince of Quotidian
 Tom Paulin, Walking a Line
 Peter Porter, Millennial Fables
 Craig Raine, History: The Home Movie
 Peter Redgrove, My Father's Trapdoors
 Peter Scupham, The Ark
 Jon Silkin, Watersmeet
 C. H. Sisson, What and Who
 Sir Stephen Spender, Dolphins
 Anthony Thwaite, The Dust of the World
 Hugo Williams, Dock Leaves, Faber and Faber
 Gerard Woodward, After The Deafening

Criticism, scholarship and biography in the United Kingdom
 John Heath-Stubbs, Hindsights : An Autobiography

United States
 Kim Addonizio, The Philosopher's Club (BOA Editions)
 A. R. Ammons, The North Carolina Poems
 Maya Angelou, The Complete Collected Poems of Maya Angelou
 John Ashbery, And the Stars Were Shining
 Ted Berrigan, Selected Poems
 Sophie Cabot Black, The Misunderstanding of Nature, (Graywolf Press) received the Poetry Society of America Norma Farber First Book Award, 
 Rosellen Brown, Cora Fry's Pillow Book
 Russell Edson, The Tunnel: Selected Poems of Russell Edson
 Jane Hirshfield, The October Palace
 Edward Hirsch, Earthly Measures
 John Hollander, Animal Poems
 Andrew Hudgins, The Glass Hammer
 Galway Kinnell, Imperfect Thirst (Houghton Mifflin)
 Kenneth Koch:
 On the Great Atlantic Rainway: Selected Poems, 1950-1988, New York: Knopf
 One Train: Poems, New York: Knopf
 James McMichael, Each in a Place Apart
 Robert Pinsky, translation of Dante's Inferno
 Wendy Rose, Bone Dance
 Mary Jo Salter, Sunday Skaters
 Patti Smith, Early Work
 Rosmarie Waldrop, A Key Into the Language of America (New Directions Publishers)

Criticism, scholarship and biography in the United States
 Louise Glück, Proofs & Theories, with pieces on George Oppen, John Berryman, Robinson Jeffers, and Stanley Kunitz
 Ian Hamilton, editor, The Oxford Companion to Twentieth-century Poetry in English, New York: Oxford University Press
 Janet Malcolm, The Silent Woman, a study of Sylvia Plath
 Mary Oliver, A Poetry Handbook
 Carl Woodring, editor, Columbia History of British Poetry, New York: Columbia University Press

Anthologies in the United States
 Douglas Messerli, editor, From the Other Side of the Century: A New American Poetry, 1960-1990, including American and Canadian poets; Sun and Moon Press (Messerli's own imprint) 
 Carolyn Forché, Against Forgetting: Twentieth-Century Poetry of Witness
 Jane Hirshfield, editor, Women in Praise of the Sacred: Forty-Three Centuries of Spiritual Poetry by Women
 Paul Hoover, editor, Postmodern American Poetry (Norton) The introduction identifies the use of postmodern with its early mention by Charles Olson, and identifies the field chosen as experimental poetry from after 1945; about 20 short essays on poetics also included
 E. Ethelbert Miller, In Search of Color Everywhere, including almost 150 African-American poets

Poets in The Best American Poetry 1994 anthology
Poems from these 75 poets were in The Best American Poetry 1994 edited by David Lehman, guest editor A. R. Ammons:

Dick Allen
Tom Andrews
John Ashbery
Burlin Barr
Cynthia Bond
Catherine Bowman
George Bradley
Charles Bukowski
Rebecca Byrkit
Amy Clampitt
Michelle T. Clinton
James Cummins
Ramola Dharmaraj
Thomas M. Disch
Mark Doty

Denise Duhamel
Tony Esolen
Richard Foerster
Alice Fulton
Allison Funk
Jorie Graham
Debora Greger
Donald Hall
Forrest Hamer
Lyn Hejinian
Roald Hoffmann
John Hollander
Janet Holmes
Paul Hoover
Richard Howard

Phyllis Janowitz
Mark Jarman
Alice Jones
Rodney Jones
Brigit Pegeen Kelly
Caroline Knox
Kenneth Koch
Dionisio D. Martínez
J. D. McClatchy
Jeffrey McDaniel
James McManus
James Merrill
W. S. Merwin
Stephen Paul Miller
Jenny Mueller

Harryette Mullen
Brighde Mullins
Fred Muratori
Sharon Olds
Maureen Owen
Kathleen Peirce
Carl Phillips
Lloyd Schwartz
Frederick Seidel
Alan Shapiro
Angela Shaw
Charles Simic
William De Witt Snodgrass
Elizabeth Spires
A. E. Stallings

Mark Strand
Sharan Strange
May Swenson
Janet Sylvester
James Tate
Patricia Traxler
William Wadsworth
Kevin Walker
Rosanne Wasserman
Bruce Weigl
Joshua Weiner
Henry Weinfield
Michael White
Richard Wilbur
Dean Young

Other in English
 Vinay Dharwadker and A. K. Ramanujan, editors, The Oxford Anthology of Modern Indian Poetry, Delhi: Oxford University Press

Works published in other languages
Listed by nation where the work was first published and again by the poet's native land, if different; substantially revised works listed separately:

Danish
 Naja Marie Aidt, Det tredje landskap ("The Third Landscape"), third volume of a poetic trilogy which started with Sålænge jeg er ung ("As Long as I'm Young") 1991, and included Et Vanskeligt mode ("A Difficult Encounter") 1992
 Benny Andersen, Denne kommen og gåen
 Katrine Marie Guldager, Dagene skifter hænder, ("The Days Change Hands"); Denmark
 Vagn Lundbye, Lundbyes dyrefabler
 Pia Tafdrup, Territorialsang
 Ole Wivel, Iris

Dutch
 Bernlef, Vreemde wil
 Toon Tellegen, Tijger onder de slakken
 Leonard Nolens, Honing en As

French language

Canada
 Robert Melançon, L'Avant-printemps à Montréal

France
 Édouard Glissant,

German
 Durs Grünbein, Falten und Fallen
 Jürgen Kolbe, a book of poetry
 Robert Gernhardt, a book of poetry

Criticism, scholarship, and biography in Germany
 Erich Mühsam, Tagebücher, 1910-1924 (posthumous)

Hebrew
 Haim Gouri, Ha-Ba Aharai ("Poems"), Israel

India
Listed in alphabetical order by first name:
 Jiban Narah, O’ Mor Dhuniya Kapou Phul, Guwahati, Assam: Students’ Store; Assamese-language
 Joy Goswami Pagli Tomar Songe, winner of the Sahitya Akademi Award in 2000; Kolkata: Ananda Publishers, ; Bangladeshi-language
 K. Satchidanandan, Malayalam-language:
 Desatanam, ("Going Places")
Kochiyile Vrikshangal, Kozhikode, Kerala: Mulberry Publications; Malayalam-language poet, critic and academic
 K. Siva Reddy, Ajeyam, Hyderabad: Jhari Poetry Circle, Telugu-language
 Nilmani Phookan, Sagartalir Sankha, Selected Poems edited by Hiren Gohain, Guwahati, Assam: Lawyers’ Book Stall; Assamese-language
 Nirendranath Chakravarti, Chollisher Dinguli, Kolkata: Ananda Publishers, Kolkata; Bengali-language
 Rajendra Kishore Panda, Bodhinabha ("The Bodhi-Sky"), Cuttack: Bharat Bharati; in Oraya and in English
 Teji Grover, Lo Kaha Sanbari, New Delhi: National Publishing House, ; Hindi-language
 Thangjam Ibopishak Singh, Bhoot Amasung Maikhum ("The Ghost and Mask"), Imphal: Writer's Forum; Meitei language

Poland
 Stanisław Barańczak, Podroz zimowa ("Journey in Winter"), Poznan: a5
Juliusz Erazm Bolek, Serce błyskawicy
 Ewa Lipska, Stypendisci czasu, ("Time's Scholarship Winners"); Wroclaw: Wydawnictwo Dolnoslaskie
 Bronisław Maj, Światło ("Light"); Cracow: Znak
 Eugeniusz Tkaczyszyn-Dycki, Młodzieniec o wzorowych obyczajach
 Czesław Miłosz, Na brzegu rzeki ("Facing the River"); Kraków: Znak
 Adam Zagajewski, Ziemia ognista ("Land in Flames"),  Poznañ: A5

Spanish language

Spain
 Matilde Camus, Ronda de azules ("Blue avenue")

Latin America
 Mario Benedetti, Inventario dos (1985-1994) ("Inventory Two (1985-1994)"), published in Madrid, Uruguay
 José Emilio Pacheco, El silencio de la luna, Mexico
 Francisco Hernández, El infierno es un decir, Mexico
 Octavio Paz. Obras completas, Mexico

Sweden
 Katarina Frostenson, Tankarna
 Ann Jäderlund, Mörker mörka mörkt kristaller
 Arne Johnsson, Faglarnas eldhuvuden

Criticism, scholarship and biography in Sweden
 Lars Huldén, Carl Michael Bellman, on the 18th-century poet
 Olof Lagercrantz, In Jag bor i en annan värld men du bor ju i samma, about the author's friendship with poet Gunnar Ekelöf
 Lars Gustafsson, Ett minnespalats. Vertikala memoarer., a memoir
 Ylva Eggehorn, Kvarteret Radiomottagaren, a memoir of her childhood

Other languages
 Hugo Claus, Gedichten 1948-1993, Flemish
 Wang Xiaoni, Fangzhu Shenzhen ("Exile in Shenzhen"), China
 Yi Sha, Esi de shiren ("Poets Starved to Death"), China

Awards and honors

Australia
 C. J. Dennis Prize for Poetry: Robert Gray, Certain Things
 Dinny O'Hearn Poetry Prize: The Monkey's Mask by Dorothy Porter
 Kenneth Slessor Prize for Poetry: Barry Hill, Ghosting William Buckley
 Mary Gilmore Prize: Aileen Kelly - Coming Up for Light

Canada
 Gerald Lampert Award: Barbara Klar, The Night You Called Me a Shadow and Ilya Tourtidis, Mad Magellan's Tale
 Archibald Lampman Award: John Newlove, Apology for Absence: Selected Poems 1962–1992
 1994 Governor General's Awards: Robert Hilles, Cantos from a Small Room (English); Fulvio Caccia, Aknos (French)
 Pat Lowther Award: Diana Brebner, The Golden Lotus
 Prix Alain-Grandbois: Gilbert Langevin, Le Cercle ouvert
 Dorothy Livesay Poetry Prize: Gregory Scofield, The Gathering: Stones for the Medicine Wheel
 Prix Émile-Nelligan: Monique Deland, Géants dans l’île

India
 Sahitya Akademi Award : Ashok Vajpayee for Kahin Nahin Wohoin
 Poetry Society India National Poetry Competition : Anju Makhija for A Farmer's Ghost

United Kingdom
 Cholmondeley Award: Ruth Fainlight, Gwen Harwood, Elizabeth Jennings, John Mole
 Eric Gregory Award: Julia Copus, Alice Oswald, Steven Blyth, Kate Clanchy, Giles Goodland
 Forward Poetry Prize (United Kingdom, Best Collection): Alan Jenkins, Harm (Chatto & Windus)
 Forward Poetry Prize (United Kingdom, Best First Collection): Kwame Dawes, Progeny of Air (Peepal Tree)
 T. S. Eliot Prize (United Kingdom and Ireland): Paul Muldoon, The Annals of Chile
 Whitbread Award for poetry: James Fenton, Out of Danger
 National Poetry Competition : David Hart for The Silkies

United States
 Agnes Lynch Starrett Poetry Prize: Jan Beatty, Mad River
 Aiken Taylor Award for Modern American Poetry: Wendell Berry
 AML Award for poetry to Pamela Porter Hamblin for "Magi"
 Bernard F. Connors Prize for Poetry: Stewart James, "Vanessa", and (separately) Marilyn Hacker, "Cancer Winter"
 Bobbitt National Prize for Poetry: A. R. Ammons, Garbage
 National Book Award for poetry (United States): James Tate, A Worshipful Company of Fletchers
 Pulitzer Prize for Poetry: Yusef Komunyakaa, Neon Vernacular: New and Selected Poems
 Ruth Lilly Poetry Prize: Donald Hall
 Wallace Stevens Award inaugurated with first award this year: W. S. Merwin
 Whiting Awards: Mark Doty, Wayne Koestenbaum, Mary Swander
 William Carlos Williams Award: Cyrus Cassells, The Mud Actor
 Fellowship of the Academy of American Poets: David Ferry

New Zealand
 Montana Book Award for Poetry: Bill Manhire, ed., 100 New Zealand Poems
 New Zealand Book Award for Poetry: Andrew Johnston, How to Talk

Other
 Norway: Brague Prize: Sigmund Mjelve for Omrade aldri fastlagt

Deaths
Birth years link to the corresponding "[year] in poetry" article:
 January 1 – Chaganti Somayajulu (born 1915), Indian, Telugu-language short-story writer and poet
 February 6 — D.I. Antoniou (born in 1906), Greek poet
 February 20 — Rolf Jacobsen, 86 (born 1907), Norwegian modernist poet
 March 9 — Charles Bukowski, 73 (born 1920), American poet and novelist, of leukemia
 March 29 — Lynda Hull, 49 (born 1955), American poet, in an automobile accident
 May 24 — John Wain, 69 (born 1925), English poet, novelist and critic, of a stroke
 July 5 — Jack Clemo, 78 (born 1916), English poet of Cornwall
 August 28 — David Wright, 74 (born 1920), English poet, of cancer
 September 10 — Amy Clampitt, 74, American poet, of ovarian cancer
 November 28 — Ian Serraillier, 82 (born 1912), English children's writer
 December 12 — Donna J. Stone, 61 (born 1933), American poet and philanthropist, of heart failure
 date not known — Rhoda Bulter (born 1929), Scottish poet of Shetland

See also

Poetry
List of years in poetry
List of poetry awards

Notes

20th-century poetry
Poetry